Aphantaulax ensifera is a species of ground spiders native to São Tomé and Príncipe. The species was named by Eugène Simon in 1907.

The male holotype measures up to 4 mm.

References

Gnaphosidae
Spiders of Africa
Spiders described in 1907
Endemic fauna of São Tomé and Príncipe
Fauna of São Tomé Island